Gustave Henri Lauvaux (9 October 1900 – 19 July 1970) was a French distance runner who competed mainly in the Cross Country Team event. He competed with the French Cross Country Team in the 1924 Summer Olympics held in Paris, France, where he and his teammates Gaston Heuet and Maurice Norland won the bronze medal.

References

External links
 

1900 births
1970 deaths
French male long-distance runners
Olympic bronze medalists for France
Athletes (track and field) at the 1924 Summer Olympics
Athletes (track and field) at the 1928 Summer Olympics
Olympic athletes of France
Medalists at the 1924 Summer Olympics
Olympic bronze medalists in athletics (track and field)
Olympic cross country runners
20th-century French people